The meridian 112° east of Greenwich is a line of longitude that extends from the North Pole across the Arctic Ocean, Asia, the Indian Ocean, the Southern Ocean, and Antarctica to the South Pole.

The 112th meridian east forms a great circle with the 68th meridian west.

From Pole to Pole
Starting at the North Pole and heading south to the South Pole, the 112th meridian east passes through:

{| class="wikitable plainrowheaders"
! scope="col" width="130" | Co-ordinates
! scope="col" | Country, territory or sea
! scope="col" | Notes
|-
| style="background:#b0e0e6;" | 
! scope="row" style="background:#b0e0e6;" | Arctic Ocean
| style="background:#b0e0e6;" |
|-
| style="background:#b0e0e6;" | 
! scope="row" style="background:#b0e0e6;" | Laptev Sea
| style="background:#b0e0e6;" |
|-
| 
! scope="row" | 
| Krasnoyarsk Krai — Taymyr Peninsula
|-
| style="background:#b0e0e6;" | 
! scope="row" style="background:#b0e0e6;" | Laptev Sea
| style="background:#b0e0e6;" |
|-
| 
! scope="row" | 
| Sakha Republic — Bolshoy Begichev Island
|-
| style="background:#b0e0e6;" | 
! scope="row" style="background:#b0e0e6;" | Laptev Sea
| style="background:#b0e0e6;" |
|-valign="top"
| 
! scope="row" | 
| Sakha Republic Krasnoyarsk Krai — from  Sakha Republic — from  Irkutsk Oblast — from  Republic of Buryatia — from  Zabaykalsky Krai — from 
|-
| 
! scope="row" | 
|
|-valign="top"
| 
! scope="row" | 
| Inner Mongolia
|-
| 
! scope="row" | 
| For about 6 km
|-valign="top"
| 
! scope="row" | 
| Inner Mongolia Shanxi – from  Henan – from  Hubei – from  Hunan – from  Guangxi – for about 3 km from  Guangdong – from  Guangxi - for about 6 km from  Guangdong - for about 5 km from  Guangxi – from  Guangdong – from 
|-
| style="background:#b0e0e6;" | 
! scope="row" style="background:#b0e0e6;" | South China Sea
| style="background:#b0e0e6;" |
|-valign="top"
| 
! scope="row" | 
| Guangdong – Hailing Island
|-valign="top"
| style="background:#b0e0e6;" | 
! scope="row" style="background:#b0e0e6;" | South China Sea
| style="background:#b0e0e6;" | Passing through the disputed Paracel Islands Passing through the disputed Spratly Islands
|-
| 
! scope="row" | 
| Sarawak – on the island of Borneo
|-
| 
! scope="row" | 
| Island of BorneoWest KalimantanCentral Kalimantan
|-
| style="background:#b0e0e6;" | 
! scope="row" style="background:#b0e0e6;" | Java Sea
| style="background:#b0e0e6;" |
|-
| 
! scope="row" | 
| Island of Java
|-
| style="background:#b0e0e6;" | 
! scope="row" style="background:#b0e0e6;" | Indian Ocean
| style="background:#b0e0e6;" |
|-
| style="background:#b0e0e6;" | 
! scope="row" style="background:#b0e0e6;" | Southern Ocean
| style="background:#b0e0e6;" |
|-
| 
! scope="row" | Antarctica
| Australian Antarctic Territory, claimed by 
|-
|}

e112 meridian east